Antonee Robinson (born August 8, 1997), nicknamed Jedi, is a professional soccer player who plays as a left-back for Premier League club Fulham and the United States national team.

Youth soccer
Born in Milton Keynes, England, Robinson came through Everton's academy, having been with the academy since the age of 11. In June 2013, he signed a scholarship with the club, becoming a full-time player.

Club career

Everton
While with Everton's U18 side, Robinson suffered injuries that saw him sidelined most of the time. He appeared for the U21 side toward the end of the 2014–15 season. As a result, he was awarded the club's Under-18 Players' Player of the Season. At the end of the 2014–15 season, he signed his first professional contract with the club after being offered a new contract.

However, Robinson spent the most of the 2015–16 season sidelined by torn cartilage under his kneecap, resulting in knee surgery. Despite this, he signed a one-year contract extension on July 15, 2016. Robinson then played all three matches in the EFL Trophy, which saw Everton U23s eliminated in the Group stage. He also became a regular for the U23 side. At the end of the 2016–17 season, Robinson signed a two-year contract extension with the club.

Loan to Bolton Wanderers
On August 4, 2017, it was announced that Antonee Robinson had signed on loan with Bolton Wanderers until January 2018.

Five days after joining the club, on August 9, 2017, he made his debut in a 2–1 League Cup win at Crewe Alexandra. Two weeks later, on August 22, 2017, he set up a goal for Jem Karacan to score the club's third goal in a 3–2 win over Sheffield Wednesday in the League Cup. He made his league debut for the side on September 9, 2017, in a 3–0 loss against Middlesbrough, playing the full 90 minutes. Robinson then established himself in the left-back position, beating out competition from Andrew Taylor. It was announced on January 5, 2018, that Robinson had agreed to stay at Bolton for the remainder of the season.

Wigan Athletic
On July 15, 2019, Robinson joined Wigan Athletic on a permanent three-year contract. He made his debut for Wigan against Rotherham United and scored his first goal for the club in a 2–2 draw at Millwall on November 26, 2019.

After impressing for Wigan in the EFL Championship as one of the league's top left backs, Robinson was set to sign with Serie A side A.C. Milan for $13 million before the transfer deadline of January 31, 2020. However, the deal fell through when Robinson's medical examination at Milan revealed a heart rhythm irregularity for which further testing could not be completed before the deadline, and for which he would undergo an ablation procedure as treatment.

Fulham
Following Wigan's relegation from the Championship, Robinson moved to Premier League club Fulham on August 20, 2020, for £2 million.
He made his debut for the club in a league cup game against Ipswich Town on September 16 in a Fulham win. He then played in the next round on September 23 against Sheffield Wednesday in 2–0 win. He played in the 3–0 loss to Brentford in the league cup on October 1. He made his Premier League debut on October 4 against Wolverhampton. He scored his first goal for the club in an EFL Cup tie against Birmingham City on August 24, 2021.

International career
Robinson was eligible for both England and the United States. He was born and raised in Milton Keynes, England. His father was born in England but raised in White Plains, New York and gained American citizenship. Robinson is also of Jamaican descent through his paternal grandmother.

Robinson was first capped at under-18 level with the United States. He was also called into the United States under-20 side, although was not capped. In March 2018, Robinson was invited to both the United States senior and England under-21 camps, and accepted the United States senior call for a friendly against Paraguay in which he was named to the bench. He made his United States senior debut on May 28, 2018, playing the full 90 minutes in a 3–0 friendly win against Bolivia and recording an assist.

Career statistics

Club

International

Scores and results list United States' goal tally first.

Honors
Fulham
EFL Championship: 2021–22

United States
CONCACAF Nations League: 2019–20

Individual
EFL Championship Team of the Season: 2021–22 Championship

References

External links

Profile at the Fulham F.C. website
 

Living people
1997 births
People from Milton Keynes
Footballers from Buckinghamshire
American soccer players
English footballers
Association football fullbacks
Everton F.C. players
Bolton Wanderers F.C. players
Wigan Athletic F.C. players
Fulham F.C. players
English Football League players
Premier League players
United States men's youth international soccer players
United States men's under-23 international soccer players
United States men's international soccer players
2022 FIFA World Cup players
American people of English descent
American people of Jamaican descent
English people of American descent
English people of Jamaican descent
Citizens of the United States through descent